(the) New Release is the second and final studio album by American nu metal band Primer 55. Released on August 14, 2001, the album peaked at number one on the Billboard Heatseekers chart and number 102 on the Billboard 200. It had one single, "This Life," which peaked at number 37 on Mainstream Rock Tracks. This would be the band's final record with Island Records, who allegedly cut support shortly after the album's release due to the September 11 attacks.

Recording
Primer 55 had underdone various lineup changes preceding and during the recording process of (the) New Release. After the band's first eighteen months of touring, guitarist Bobby Burns started writing the band's second major label album. He played all guitars and bass in the studio and brought in ex-Helmet drummer John Stanier. While in the studio, Burns also began talks with drummer Preston Nash of Dope with whom Primer 55 had previously toured. By May 2001, the band had officially recruited former Cut.Love.Kill bassist Chris Sprinkle but mere weeks later announced Kobie Jackson as their new bassist.

Musical style
Whereas the band's major label debut, Introduction to Mayhem, boasted strong hip hop tendencies, (the) New Release demonstrated a broader variety with bluesy vocals, saxophone, and piano scattered throughout. Regarding the band's new musical direction, Bobby Burns stated  "I just grew very, very sick of the whole music scene last year... All the plastic bands that were put together by record companies, etc. I didn't want to hear any of that music any longer... So I didn't... I went back to what was real to me and what made me feel good growing up... Sabbath, Zeppelin, and Kiss... Back then you could tell all those bands apart, and music of today just sounds like the same records made over and over with all the same guitar sounds and shit." Vocalist Jason "J-Sin" Luttrell remarked in 2001 that "During the writing and recording period, we never listened to the radio or watched MTV because we didn't want any outside influences creeping into the songs. We wanted everything to be fresh."

Promotion and touring
By mid-May, Primer 55 announced the title and release date of their upcoming album as well as its lead single. A tentative track listing was announced in June but later modified. The band released various tracks from (the) New Release, including a rough mix of its upcoming single, on their official website in the months leading up to its release.

Although Burns had hoped to see "Texas" become the second single, (the) New Release featured only one single, "This Life" which was released to radio on July 16. It had no accompanying video but gained moderate radio rotation in late summer and early fall of 2001. The track was also included on More Fast and Furious: Music from and Inspired by the Motion Picture The Fast and the Furious and Nu Rock Traxx, Vol. 32. Promotion was allegedly cut short by Island, forcing the album's success to rely heavily on touring.

From June through August, the group joined Fear Factory's The Evolution of Revolution tour. Primer 55 then supported Vision of Disorder for some August dates. and played at the Riverfront Rampage to celebrate the 15th anniversary of the WSOU college radio station in Newark, New Jersey. They also joined Slipknot's Pledge of Allegiance tour and performed into the following year.

In October 2002, bassist Kobie Jackson was asked to leave the band due to "personal and creative problems." He was temporarily replaced with Toomey, formerly of 12v Negative Earth. In November and December, Primer 55 played on the Jägermeister-sponsored $12 Riot Tour with Dope, Skinlab, and Society 1.

Reception

Commercial success
(the) New Release peaked at number one on the Billboard Heatseekers chart and number 102 on the Billboard 200. The album's single, "This Life" peaked at number 37 on the Mainstream Rock Tracks chart. In the week ending on November 11, the album's thirteenth week of release, SoundScan reported sales figures at 53,191.

However, despite debuting on the Billboard 200 and selling 15,000 copies in its first week, Island allegedly cut support for the album merely two months after its release. Guitarist Bobby Burns reflected on the matter in a 2008 interview, exclaiming, "It totally fucking sucked! The album was out two months then 9/11 happened and we got lost in that shuffle that was going on in New York at that time."

A music video was also allegedly in the works for "This Life," but in September 2001, Burns defused this claim, lamenting, "I have no idea what's going on with our label."

Critical response

Allmusic's Michael Gallucci criticizes the album, declaring, "Plenty of other bands do this stuff a whole lot better and with much more conviction."

Track listing

B-sides
 "Feel Like You"

Charts

Album

Singles

Personnel

Musicians
Jason Luttrell – vocals
Sam Albright — saxophone
Bobby Burns — bass, guitar, backing vocals, mandocello, programming
Preston Nash — drums, programming
John Stanier — drums
Eddie Wohl — piano, programming, producer, Rhodes piano, mixing

Production
Rob Caggiano — mixing
Frank Gargiulo	— art direction, design, photography
Matt James — vocal producer
Michael Messier — engineer
Rick Patrick — creative director
Steve Regina — producer, engineer, mixing
J.P. Sheganoski — engineer

References

2001 albums
Island Records albums
Primer 55 albums
Albums produced by Eddie Wohl